Cabin Brook is a river in Broome County, New York and Delaware County, New York. It flows into Cold Spring Creek north of Stilesville.

References

Rivers of New York (state)
Rivers of Delaware County, New York
Rivers of Broome County, New York